Kuhestan (also Romanized as Kūhestān) is a village in Kuhestan Rural District, in the Central District of Behshahr County, Mazandaran Province, Iran. At the 2006 census, its population was 1,691, in 445 families.

References 

Populated places in Behshahr County